Liar's Moon is a 1982 film directed by David Fisher and starring Matt Dillon, Cindy Fisher, Yvonne DeCarlo, and Hoyt Axton. It tells the story of two star-crossed lovers in 1940s Texas—a working-class teen and the banker's daughter who elope to much strife. Texas band Asleep At The Wheel provided multiple songs for the film.

Synopsis
In 1940s east Texas, Jack Duncan, a high school graduate from a blue-collar family, falls in love with Ginny Peterson, who has just returned to town from four years of boarding school. Ginny's father Alex is the town's wealthy banker and was formerly high school sweethearts with Jack's mother, Babs. However, Alex strenuously objects to Ginny's relationship with Jack. At the end of the summer, Jack and Ginny elope in Louisiana—where 17-year-olds can marry without their parents' permission. Jack gets a job in the oil fields while Ginny earns money for household work in the boarding house they now live in.

Alex hires private eye Ray Logan to find the couple. Meanwhile, Ginny learns she is pregnant. Before she can tell Jack, her doctor contacts her previous physician in Texas and reveals that she and Jack share the same father. Upon hearing this upsetting news, Ginny asks Lora Mae Bouvier, a resident in the boarding house who works as a prostitute, to direct her to a midwife who provides illegal abortions. 

While Ginny goes to find the provider, the doctor gets an update from Texas that the couple aren’t actually related as Jack’s mother had his birth records changed out of spite when Ginny’s dad dumped her. Ginny goes ahead with the back-alley procedure, which goes badly and results in complications. Jack manages to find Ginny and she is taken to a hospital. Jack enters the hospital room, where Ginny tells him, "I bet there's a liar's moon out tonight", and the film ends with her survival implied.

Alternate ending 
Two different endings were filmed and distributed. In the original ending, Ginny dies from complications after the unsafe abortion. This ending was deemed too dark for test audiences, and the happier ending where Ginny lives was screened in some theaters. Cable TV airings have shown both the more positive ending or the original ending, depending on the television channel. VHS copies of the film also included both endings.

Cast

Production 
According to the making-of featurette on the film's Blu-ray release, Billy Hanna wrote the screenplay with his daughter Janice, "drawing on his own experiences growing up on the wrong side of the tracks in Illinois." 

The film was shot in and around Houston, Texas. It was Broderick Crawford's last film after 45 years and one of Matt Dillon's earliest films. Liar's Moon was choreographed by Patsy Swayze.

Critical response 
In retrospective reviews, critics said Liar's Moon is "highlighted by some fresh young performances", but "veers into an abyss of melodrama in the final reel."

Home media 
On February 8, 2022, the MVD Rewind Collection released the film in a high definition Blu-ray edition, which includes making-of featurettes and the alternate ending.

References

External links

Liar's Moon at AllMovie

1982 films
1982 romantic drama films
American romantic drama films
American teen romance films
1980s teen romance films
1980s teen drama films
Films set in Houston
Films shot in Houston
Crown International Pictures films
1980s English-language films
1980s American films
Teenage pregnancy in film
Films set in the 1940s
Films about abortion